Jorge Patricio Sasmay Román (unknown – 17 January 2016), known as Patricio Sasmay, was a Chilean professional footballer who played as a goalkeeper for clubs in Chile and El Salvador.

Career
In his homeland, Sasmay played for Unión Española and Magallanes in the top division.

He after developed his career in the Salvadoran football, playing for clubs such as Club Deportivo UCA, Excélsior, Atlético Marte and Águila.

Personal life
His parents were Jorge Sasmay Vera and Sylvia Iris Román Rojas.

Sasmay was of Diaguita descent.

He died on 17 January 2016 in Antiguo Cuscatlán, El Salvador.

References

2016 deaths
Chilean people of Diaguita descent
Chilean footballers
Chilean expatriate footballers
Unión Española footballers
Deportes Magallanes footballers
Magallanes footballers
C.D. Atlético Marte footballers
C.D. Águila footballers
Chilean Primera División players
Salvadoran Primera División players
Chilean expatriate sportspeople in El Salvador
Expatriate footballers in El Salvador
Association football goalkeepers
Indigenous sportspeople of the Americas
Date of birth missing
Place of birth missing